Yarino is a rural locality (a village) in Dobryansky District, Perm Krai, Russia. The population was 11 as of 2010. There are 7 streets.

Geography 
Yarino is located 13 km east of Dobryanka (the district's administrative centre) by road. Traktovy is the nearest rural locality.

References 

Rural localities in Dobryansky District